Markahirka or Marka Hirka (Quechua marka village, Ancash Quechua hirka mountain, "village mountain", Hispanicized spellings Marca Jirca, Marcajirca) is an archaeological site with cave paintings and stone tombs (chullpa) on a mountain of the same name in Peru. It is located in the Ancash Region, Huari Province, in the districts of Cajay and Masin. Markahirka is also a good viewpoint with views into the Puchka valley (Puchca) and to the towns of Huari (Wari) and Huachis (Wachis).

References 

Archaeological sites in Ancash Region
Archaeological sites in Peru
Rock art in South America
Tombs in Peru
Mountains of Peru
Mountains of Ancash Region